is a Shinto shrine located in the city of Uji in Kyoto Prefecture, Japan. It is adjacent to the Ujigami Shrine.

External links 

Uji, Kyoto
Important Cultural Properties of Japan
Shinto shrines in Kyoto Prefecture